Villa Juárez is a municipality and town located in the central part of the Mexican state of San Luis Potosí.  It was founded in 1643 as Santa Gertrudis de Carbonera.  In 1928 the name was changed to Villa Juárez to honor Benito Juárez, one of México's most admired presidents.

Location
The municipality extends throughout 18 small villages including El Granjenal, Palo Seco, and Puerta del Río. Villa Juarez is surrounded by Cerritos to the north, Rio Verde to the east and south, and with San Nicolás Tolentino to the west.

History

It was founded in 1643 as Santa Gertrudis de Carbonera and in 1928, the name was changed to Villa Juárez due to the expansion of population.

Economy
Agriculture made up most of Villa Juárez's economy.  Hot peppers (mainly serrano) and corn were the major elements of this economy.  Lack of capital to invest in farming has recently declined production. In the 19th and 20th centuries sulfur mining at Guaxcama was also important.

Culture
Villa Juárez's population, like many other Mexican towns and cities, are mostly part of Roman Catholicism. Its biggest tradition is to host a traveling carnival in honor of its patron saint, Gertrude the Great, mostly known as "Santa Gertrudis".  It begins about two weeks before the main day, 16 November. This carnival is made up of dozens of booths that sell artifacts, ceramics and artifacts, regional delicacies, food, drinks, games, literature, and small widgets among other things.  Rides are also a main attraction of the carnival.  A stage is also assembled for shows, regional and national folklore dances, musicians, speeches, and plays. Aside from this festival, Villa Juárez and its surrounding municipalities, often hold events known as "Jaripeos" which involve the riding of bulls without much, if any, protection gear. Many tourists come from all parts of the state of San Luis Potosí and from the United States (such as Texas, Illinois, Georgia, California, Wyoming and Nebraska) for this traditional event. These tourists also Vacation in Villa Juarez mainly in the Summer and Winter time. Many of the natives like to go back to Villa Juarez to get married, baptize children etc. around this time as well.

Within this municipality there still live indigenous groups of people such as the Pame (Xiu).  This municipality has been a victim of mass migration to the U.S.  Most of the remaining inhabitants are small children, middle-age females, and senior citizens.  Several internationally known musical bands have come from this municipality: Grupo Bryndis, and Agua Azul.

People that have migrated to the United States of America from Villa Juárez are so proud of their town, that they have founded various organizations and clubs throughout the States to send help to their town.  Some of these clubs include:  Fundación Villa Juárez de Houston, Texas; Club Social Villa Juárez en Dallas, Texas; Club Social Villa Juárez en Illinois; and Club Social Villa Juárez en Nebraska.  There are comments that clubs will form in Gonzáles, Texas and in Atlanta, Georgia.  These clubs have made many contributions to Villa Juárez.  For example, Fundación Villa Juárez de Houston, Texas took the initiative to construct the Municipal Market (Mercado Municipal).

Municipal Presidents

Urbano Mata Zapata (1980-1982)

Víctor García Almazán (2001-2003)
Juan Izaguirre Ostiguin  (2004-2006)
Everardo Izaguirre Gloria  (2007-2009)
Jesus Ruiz Castillo (2010-2012)
Ignacio Chavira (2012-2015)
Juan Manuel Sánchez Martinez (2015-2018)
Lisa Avigail (2018-present)

External links
Villa Juárez, SLP
CNN News 24 September 2001
Enciclopedia de Municipios de Mexico
Gobierno de Villa Juarez, SLP

Bibliography
Roque, Alexandro (2004) Villa Juárez La bella villa

Populated places in San Luis Potosí
Populated places established in 1643
1643 establishments in the Spanish Empire